Luminous (stylized in all caps) is a South Korean idol group signed with SE Group Entertainment (formerly Barunson WIP). Consisting of members Youngbin, Suil, Steven, and Woobin, the quartet released the pre-debut mini-album Vision in August 2021 before launching its first mini-album Youth the following month. The group has since released a second mini-album entitled Between Light and Darkness (Self n Ego) and its first full-length album Luminous in Wonderland in 2022.

History
Luminous was originally set to begin releasing music with a different name and company in 2019, but the group's debut was delayed. Vocal trainer Kim Sung-eun, who had previously worked with numerous artists including BTS and Twice, founded the music agency Barunson WIP and took in the ensemble with members Youngbin, Suil, Steven, and Woobin. The name of the group was decided by vote and given the meaning of "a light shining brightly even in the dark". A fictional universe was introduced as part of Luminous's concept and the members symbolize the elements of thunder (Suil), fire (Steven), light (Youngbin), and moonlight (Woobin).

On August 17, 2021, Barunson WIP announced its plans to debut the four-member group produced by Kim and Barunson E&A, with its debut album slated to be issued in early September. Luminous released a surprise pre-debut album entitled Vision and "Dreaming Luminous" two days later. The album also included solo songs composed by each member. Luminous' debut mini-album Youth was scheduled to be released on September 1, but was postponed following Youngbin's COVID-19 diagnosis. It was released along with the lead single "Run" on September 9. The quartet made its first live performance on SBS MTV's music chart program The Show on September 14. Luminous held a mini fan concert on October 4 called Youth: You and I. A music video for the album track "Home Alone" was released later that month.

Luminous released its second mini-album Between Light and Darkness (Self n Ego) and lead single "All Eyes Down (Advance)" on January 20, 2022. Inspired by the fictional supervillain Joker, the album delves into the "confusion between the real self and the created self" as the lyrics try to determine, "Who am I?". Announced one day prior, the group made the mid-tempo pop song "Wish You Were Here" available on online music platforms on May 21. Luminous released their first studio album Luminous in Wonderland and its two single "Engine" and "Creature" on August 17.

Musical style
Luminous's lyrical theme revolves around youth. The group aims to "convey a message of hope and comfort" to that audience through the songs lyrics. Upon its debut, Luminous laid its music foundation in hip hop integrated with R&B and pop. Luminous's first few singles comprised a dark atmosphere, but the group's music shifted to a "clear, bright" direction with "Engine".

Members
List of members and roles.
 Youngbin – leader, lead vocals, dance
 Suil – sub-vocals, rap, dance
 Steven – sub-vocals, rap
 Woobin – main vocals

Discography

Albums

Studio albums

Extended plays

Singles

Concerts
 Youth: You and I (2021)

References

External links
 

2021 establishments in South Korea
K-pop music groups
Musical groups established in 2021
Musical groups from Seoul
Vocal quartets
South Korean boy bands
South Korean contemporary R&B musical groups
South Korean hip hop groups
South Korean idol groups
South Korean pop music groups